Yasinia is an urban-type settlement in Rakhiv Raion of Zakarpattia Oblast in Ukraine. Population: 

It was the site of the Hutsul Republic after World War I, and the birthplace of several prominent Ukrainians declaring independence from Kingdom of Hungary. This republic was ended by Romanian troops on June 11, 1919. Yasinia was shortly reoccupied by Hungary in July 1919 and passed to Czechoslovakia according to the Treaty of Trianon. During 1919-39, it was that country's easternmost settlement. Hungary again occupied and annexed it as part of Carpathian Ruthenia in 1939 and held it until the end of the war. It was given to the Soviet Union in 1945.

The wooden church in Yasinia appears on several stamps of the area, including the first stamp of Carpatho-Ukraine.

People from Yasinia
 Daniel Ivancho
 Stepan Klochurak
 Orest Klympush

See also
 Kobyletska Poliana and Velykyi Bychkiv, the other two urban-type settlements in Rakhiv Raion of Zakarpattia Oblast

References

Urban-type settlements in Rakhiv Raion